The 1980–81 Challenge Cup was the 80th staging of rugby league's oldest knockout competition, the Challenge Cup. Known as the Three Fives Challenge Cup for sponsorship reasons, the final was contested by Widnes and Hull Kingston Rovers at Wembley, with Widnes winning 18–9.

First round

Second round

Third round

Semi final

Final
Hull Kingston Rovers returned to Wembley as defending champions, having won the Challenge Cup for the first time in their history in the previous year. Widnes won the match 18–9, with Widnes full-back Mick Burke being awarded the Lance Todd Trophy.

References

External links
Challenge Cup official website 
Challenge Cup 1980/81 results at Rugby League Project

Challenge Cup
Challenge Cup